Helen Watson may refer to:

 Helen Watson (cricketer) (born 1972), New Zealand cricketer
 Helen Watson (singer-songwriter), British singer and recording artist
 Helen Turner Watson (1917–1992), American nurse and educator